"Walking in the Rain" is a Top 10 single and an uncharacteristic ballad from UK salsa music band Modern Romance. It was released in 1983 as a 7-inch single and 12-inch single by WEA. A Japanese version was also released.

Formats

7-inch single
Walking in the Rain
Walking in the Rain (Blues)

12-inch single
Walking in the Rain
Walking in the Rain (Blues)

Chart position
UK Singles Chart #7

History
"Walking in the Rain" was a Top 10 single for Modern Romance and was their last Top 40 hit, released in 1983, during the David Jaymes / Michael J. Mullins era. It reached #7 on the UK chart - #1 in Thailand - and can be found on Modern Romance's two hit albums, Trick of the Light (1983) and Party Tonight (1983), and on the 2006 CD compilation album, Modern Romance: The Platinum Collection (2006). Walking in the Rain was written by David Jaymes [Modern Romance Bassist and founder member David Jaymes, and lead vocalist, Michael J. Mullins. It can also be found on the Japanese compilation, Juanita (1983).

Genre
"Walking in the Rain" is a soulful - and bluesy - wistful ballad in-keeping with the band's change from the traditional Salsa music style, something they were trying to shake. The song features the distinctive trumpet-driven sounds of John Du Prez.

Personnel
Michael J. Mullins - vocals
David Jaymes - bass guitar
Robbie Jaymes - synthesizer
Paul Gendler - guitar
John Du Prez - trumpet
Andy Kyriacou - drums
Tony Visconti - producer (music)

References

1983 singles
Modern Romance (band) songs
Song recordings produced by Tony Visconti
1983 songs
Warner Music Group singles
Songs written by David Jaymes
Songs written by Michael J. Mullins